Gaius Calpurnius Piso may refer to:

 Gaius Calpurnius Piso (conspirator)
 Gaius Calpurnius Piso (consul 180 BC)
 Gaius Calpurnius Piso (consul 67 BC)
 Gaius Calpurnius Piso (praetor 211 BC)
 Gaius Calpurnius Piso Crassus Frugi Licinianus

See also

 
 Calpurnius Piso (disambiguation)